is the eighth studio album by Japanese entertainer Miho Nakayama. Released through King Records on December 5, 1988, the album features the No. 1 single "Witches". "Sweetest Lover", "Too Fast, Too Close", and "Try or Cry" were featured in Nakayama's 1988 short film L'Aube de mon cœur.

The album peaked at No. 3 on Oricon's albums chart and sold over 250,000 copies.

Track listing

Personnel
 Miho Nakayama – vocals
 Yūji Toriyama – all instruments (A2, A5, B1, B3)
 Yoshinobu Kojima – all instruments (B2, B4)
 Yasuharu Nakanishi – keyboards (A1, A4)
 Ichirō Nagata – keyboards (A1, A4)
 Haruo Togashi – Piano (A1, A4)
 Tsuyoshi Kon – guitar (A1, A4)
 David T. Walker – guitar (B4)
 Yasuo Tomikura – bass (A1, A4)
 Hideo Yamaki – drums (A1, A4)
 Masato Honda – saxophone (A5, B1)
 Shigeo Fuchino – saxophone (B2, B4)
 Cindy – backing vocals 
 P. J. – backing vocals (A1–4)
 Michael Wilson – backing vocals (A1, B1)
 Mine Matsuki – backing vocals (A1, B3)
 Kumi Sasaki – backing vocals (except A2)
 Melody McColly – backing vocals (A2–3)
 Terrence Forsythe – backing vocals (A2–3)

Charts
Weekly charts

Year-end charts

References

External links
 
 
 

1988 albums
Miho Nakayama albums
Japanese-language albums
King Records (Japan) albums